The Keystone Party of Manitoba is a provincial political party in Manitoba, Canada. They were registered on June 28, 2022.

History

Foundation
The party was officially launched on July 15, 2022 at a meeting where it elected local farmer, Kevin Friesen, as its first leader. They describe themselves as a grassroots party that seeks to overcome divides and promote a common Manitoban identity. Described as Far-Right by multiple media outlets, party leadership insists they are "close to center" and define their ideology on the protection of civil liberties.

2023 election

The party successfully amassed over 2,500 signatures of voters needed to become a registered party in Manitoba and hopes to field candidates in all 57 Manitoba constituencies during the 43rd Manitoba general election. The party is basing its campaign on trying to connect with voters disatisifed with government overreach during the COVID-19 pandemic.

Party Platform

The party has a 10 point Statement of Principles as follows:

Fundamental Rights. Advocating for the abolition of human rights tribunals and for their powers to be delegated to other court systems. 

Personal Freedoms. Everyone is entitled to equal opportunity and to ensure that legislation reflects these opportunities.

Social Responsibility. Persons unable to care for themselves should be cared for by the Province's government. 

Service Based Leadership. Elected officials should be free to vote as they deem fit and must be held accountable by their constituents. 

Free Enterprise. Holding that the Free Market  should be the driving force behind Manitoba's economy. That protectionism is kept to a minimum to create a robust economy. 

Jurisdictional Government. That Manitoba should actively resist federal oversight as outlined in sections 92 to 95 of the Canadian Constitution. That parents should determine what schools their children go to and that the Province should "protect air, land, and water as a heritage to pass from generation to generation".

Localism. Limit the size of the provincial government to empower local municipalities. 

Justice Equality. To end backlogs in the courts to ensure they're affordable for the individual. And to ensure laws are applied equally to everyone regardless of their status and stature.

Results Based Policy. Smaller government, lower spending and balanced budgets as means to ensure financial freedom. 

Trust. The government should strive to build trust between communities, and that the best way to build trust is through transparency.

References

Right-wing parties
Provincial political parties in Manitoba